Cambio Democrático may refer to:

 Democratic Change (El Salvador)
 Democratic Change (Panama)